The Clark Kerr Award, fully the Clark Kerr Award for Distinguished Leadership in Higher Education or the Clark Kerr Medal is an award given to a person who has made "an extraordinary and distinguished contribution to the advancement of higher education." The award is given annually by the Academic Senate of the University of California, Berkeley. The award was established in 1968 as a tribute to the leadership and legacy of Clark Kerr. He was an American professor of economics and academic administrator. He was the first chancellor of the University of California, Berkeley, and twelfth president of the University of California.

Recipients

See also 
 University of California, Berkeley
 List of prizes named after people

References

University of California, Berkeley
American education awards
Awards established in 1968
Academic awards
1968 establishments in California
International awards